Kayea is a plant genus in the family Calophyllaceae.

Species include:

Kayea coriacea
Kayea ferruginea
Kayea macrophylla
Kayea megalocarpa
Kayea philippinensis
Kayea punctulata
Kayea stylosa

References

 
Malpighiales genera